Rock Spring Presbyterian Church is a historic Presbyterian church at 1824 Piedmont Avenue NE in Atlanta, Georgia.  Designed by Atlanta architect Charles H. Hopson, it was built in 1923 and additions were made to the rear in 1952 and in 1963.  It is cross-shaped in plan and Tudor Revival in style.

It was added to the National Register in 1990.  The listing included a manse building.

References

Presbyterian churches in Atlanta
Churches on the National Register of Historic Places in Georgia (U.S. state)
Tudor Revival architecture in Georgia (U.S. state)
Churches completed in 1923
National Register of Historic Places in Atlanta